Mohs surgery, developed in 1938 by a general surgeon, Frederic E. Mohs,  is microscopically controlled surgery used to treat both common and rare types of skin cancer. During the surgery, after each removal of tissue and while the patient waits, the tissue is examined for cancer cells. That examination dictates the decision for additional tissue removal. Mohs surgery is the gold standard method for obtaining complete margin control during removal of a skin cancer (complete circumferential peripheral and deep margin assessment - CCPDMA) using frozen section histology. CCPDMA or Mohs surgery allows for the removal of a skin cancer with very narrow surgical margin and a high cure rate.

The cure rate with Mohs surgery cited by most studies is between 97% and 99.8% for primary basal-cell carcinoma, the most common type of skin cancer. Mohs procedure is also used for squamous cell carcinoma, but with a lower cure rate. Recurrent basal-cell cancer has a lower cure rate with Mohs surgery, more in the range of 94%. It has been used in the removal of melanoma-in-situ (cure rate 77% to 98% depending on surgeon), and certain types of melanoma (cure rate 52%).

Other indications for Mohs surgery include dermatofibrosarcoma protuberans, keratoacanthoma, spindle cell tumors, sebaceous carcinomas, microcystic adnexal carcinoma, merkel cell carcinoma, Paget's disease of the breast, atypical fibroxanthoma, and leiomyosarcoma. Because the Mohs procedure is micrographically controlled, it provides precise removal of the cancerous tissue, while healthy tissue is spared. Mohs surgery can also be more cost effective than other surgical methods, when considering the cost of surgical removal and separate histopathological analysis. However, Mohs surgery should be reserved for the treatment of skin cancers in anatomic areas where tissue preservation is of utmost importance (face, neck, hands, lower legs, feet, genitals).

Uses
Mohs surgery is most commonly used on the head and neck, where its use conserves normal tissue and decreases the risk of recurrence.  For these reasons, it is also considered for skin cancers on hands, feet, ankles, shins, nipples, or genitals.  Mohs surgery should not be used on the trunk or extremities for uncomplicated, non-melanoma skin cancer of less than one centimeter in size. On these parts of the body, the risks exceed the benefits of the procedure.

Technique

In 2012, the American Academy of Dermatology published appropriate use criteria (AUC) on Mohs micrographic surgery in collaboration with the following organizations: American College of Mohs Surgery; American Society for Mohs Surgery; and the American Society for Dermatologic Surgery Association. More than 75 physicians contributed to the development of the Mohs surgery AUC, which were published in the Journal of the American Academy of Dermatology and Dermatologic Surgery.

The Australasian College of Dermatologists, in concert with the Australian Mohs Surgery Committee, has also developed evidence based guidelines for Mohs Surgery.

The Mohs procedure is a pathology sectioning method that allows for the complete examination of the surgical margin. It is different from the standard bread loafing technique of sectioning, where random samples of the surgical margin are examined.

Mohs surgery is performed in four steps:
 Surgical removal of tissue (Surgical Oncology)
 Mapping the piece of tissue, freezing and cutting the tissue between 5 and 10 micrometres using a cryostat, and staining with hematoxylin and eosin (H&E) or other stains (Including Toluidine Blue)
 Interpretation of microscope slides (Pathology)
 Possible reconstruction of the surgical defect (Reconstructive Surgery)

The procedure is usually performed in a physician's office under local anesthetic. A small scalpel is utilized to cut around the visible tumor. A very small surgical margin is utilized, usually with 1 to 1.5 mm of "free margin" or uninvolved skin. The amount of free margin removed is much less than the usual 4 to 6 mm required for the standard excision of skin cancers. After each surgical removal of tissue, the specimen is processed, cut on the cryostat and placed on slides, stained with H&E and then read by the Mohs surgeon/pathologist who examines the sections for cancerous cells. If cancer is found, its location is marked on the map (drawing of the tissue) and the surgeon removes the indicated cancerous tissue from the patient. This procedure is repeated until no further cancer is found.  The vast majority of cases are then reconstructed by the Mohs surgeon. Some surgeons utilize 100 micrometres between each section, and some utilize 200 micrometres between the first two sections, and 100 micrometres between subsequent sections (10 crank of tissue set at 6 to 10 micrometre is roughly equal to 100 micrometres if one allows for physical compression due to the blade).

Blood thinners
The trend in skin surgery over the last 10 years has been to continue anticoagulants while performing skin surgery. Most cutaneous bleeding can be controlled with electrocautery, especially bipolar forceps. The benefit gained by ease of hemostasis is weighed against the risk of stopping anticoagulants; and it is generally preferred to continue anticoagulants.

Cure rate
Few specialists dispute the cure rate for Mohs, especially pathologists familiar with the procedure. Extensive studies performed by Mohs involving thousands of patients with both fixed tissue and fresh tissue cases have been reported in the literature. Other surgeons repeated the studies with also thousands of cases, with nearly the same results.

Clinical 5 year cure rates with Mohs surgery:
 4085 cases of primary and recurrent cancer of face, scalp, and neck. Cure rate of 96.6%.
 1065 cases of squamous cell carcinoma of face, scalp, and neckcure rate 94.8%
 2075 cases of basal-cell cancer of the nose both primary and recurrent, cure rate 99.1%.
 Cure rate for basal-cell cancer of the ear, less than 1 cm, 124 cases, cure rate 100%.
 Cure rate of basal-cell cancer of the ear, 1 to 2 cm, 170 cases, 100%. One needs to keep in mind that the cases performed by Mohs were for large and extensive tumors, often treated numerous times before by other surgeons. Regardless, his cure rate for small primary tumors either were 100% or near 100% when separated out from larger or recurrent tumors.

These are only a small number of cases reported by Mohs, and numerous other articles by other authors have shown tremendous cure rates for primary basal-cell carcinoma. Studies by Smeet, et al. showing a Mohs cure rate of about 95%, and another study in Sweden showing Mohs cure rate of about 94%.

Cure rate variation
Some of Mohs' data revealed a cure rate as low as 96%, but these were often very large tumors, previously treated by other modalities. Some authors claim that their 5-year cure rate for primary basal-cell cancer exceeded 99% while other noted more conservative cure rate of 97%. The quoted cure rate for Mohs surgery on previously treated basal-cell cancer is about 94%. Reasons for variations in the cure rate include the following.
 Modern frozen section method. Frozen section histology does not give the added margin of safety by the cytotoxic Mohs paste, originally used by Mohs. This paste might have destroyed any residual cancer cells not detected by the pathologist.
 Missing epidermal margins. Ideally, the Mohs section should include 100% of the epidermal margin, but greater than 95% is often accepted. Unfortunately, vigorous scrubbing, poorly controlled initial curettage, poor tissue health, technician's error, and surgeon's error can introduce areas missing epithelial margin. Some surgeons consider 70% epithelial margin acceptable, while others suggest 100% margin. In the ideal situation, 100% of the epithelial margin should be available to be reviewed on serial sectioning of the Mohs specimen.
 Misreading of the pathology slide. It is difficult to differentiate between a small island of basal-cell carcinoma and a hair follicle structure. Many Mohs surgeons limit their tissue processing to include only 2 sections of tissue. This severely hampers their ability to determine if a structure is a hair follicle or a carcinoma. Two histologic sections can not fully distinguish these two nearly identical structures, and can lead to either "false negative" or "false positive" errors by either calling a section clear of tumor, or calling a section positive for tumor, respectively. Serial sectioning of the tumor is preferred by other surgeons. Surgeons who perform serial sectioning through the block of tissue (usually 100 micrometres apart) are assured of the contiguous nature of his tumor and the distance of the tumor from the surgical margin, and are familiarized with the nature of the tumor. Serial sectioning also makes it easier to work with three-dimensional tumor with margins that are difficult to compress.
 Compression artifact, freezing artifact, cautery artifact, tissue folds, crush artifact from forceps, relaxing incision artifact, cartilage dropping out, fat compression, poor staining, dropping of tumor, etc. These can be introduced as the tumor is "flattened". Stain can run from the surgical edge, and stain the surgical margin – giving a false impression that the entire surgical margin is clear, when it is not. While some surgeons unfamiliar with the "whole piece" or "PacMan" methods of processing might suggest that multiple piece sectioning is better than one, in fact the more tissue sections are cut, the more artifacts in staining and tissue malformation will be introduced. It is imperative that the surgeon be fully familiar with tissue handling and processing; and not simply rely on a trained technologist to perform his sectioning.
 Hard-to-see tumor in heavy inflammatory infiltrate. This can occur with squamous cell carcinoma, especially when complicated with local infection, or intrinsic lymphoproliferative disorders (chronic lymphocytic leukemia). Because of abnormal peripheral blood profile, response to inflammatory skin conditions with patients with myelomonocytic leukemia can have appearance of atypical cells at sites of inflammation, confusing the Mohs surgeon.
 Perineural spread, and benign changes simulating perineural spread. Tumor spreading along a nerve can be difficult to visualize, and sometime benign plasma cells can surround the nerve, simulating cancer.
 Anatomical area that is difficult to cut and process. Examples would be the ear, and other three-dimensional structures like eyelids. The ability to make a scallop shaped incision is increasingly difficult when the surgical surface is no longer a flat plane, but is a three-dimensional rigid structure.
 Recurrent skin cancer with multiple islands of recurrence. This can occur with either previous excision, or after electrodesiccation and curettage. As these residual skin cancer are often bound in scar tissue, and present in multiple location in the scar of the previous surgical defect – they are no longer contiguous in nature. Some surgeons advocate the removal of the complete scar in the treatment of "recurrent" skin cancers. Others advocate removing only the island of local recurrence, and leaving the previous surgical scar behind. The decision is often made depending on the location of the tumor, and the goal of the patient and physician.
 Unreported or underreported recurrence. Many patients do not return to the original surgeon to report a recurrence. The consulting surgeon on the repeat surgery may not inform the first surgeon of the recurrence. The time it takes for a recurrent tumor to be visible to the patient might be 5 or more years. Quoted "cure" rates must be looked upon with the understanding that a 5-year cure rate might not necessary be correct. As basal-cell carcinoma is a very slowly progressing tumor, a 5-year no recurrence rate might not be adequate. Longer follow up might be needed to detect a slow growing tumor left in the surgical scar.
 Poor training of the surgeon/pathologist/histotechnologist. While Mohs surgery is essentially a technical method of tissue handling and processing, the skill and training of the surgeon can greatly affect the outcome. Success requires a foundation of good tissue handling and good surgical skill and hemostasis, based on the tissue processing and staining technique. A surgeon without a good histotechnologist does not have access to sufficiently high quality information about the cancer, and a histotechnologist without a good surgeon can not produce quality slides. Originally, surgeons learned the procedure by spending a few hours to several months with Mohs or during their residencies. Today, many Mohs surgeons complete a fellowship after their dermatology residency, spending hundreds of hours observing and performing Mohs surgery under careful supervision of highly experienced Mohs surgeons. This is the most comprehensive and thorough method of learning Mohs surgery.  Others learn the technique in their dermatology residencies and through courses and preceptorships. It is highly encouraged that a physician interested in learning Mohs surgery should spend extended time observing, cutting, processing, and staining Mohs specimens. It is vital that the histotechnologist prepare high quality slides.  The histology block must be correctly mounted, cut, and stained the first time, as there is no second chance in Mohs histology. It is not a procedure that can be properly mastered in a short period of time.

Comparison to other modalities of treatment

 

Mohs surgery is not suitable for all skin cancers.

Mohs micrographic surgery is the most reliable form of margin control; utilising a unique frozen section histology processing technique – allowing for the complete examination of 100% of the surgical margin. The method is unique in that it is a simple way to handle soft, hard-to-cut tissue. It is superior to serial bread loafing at a 0.1 mm interval for improved false negative error rate, requiring less time, tissue handling, and fewer glass slides mounted.

The clinical quotes for cure rate of Mohs surgery are from 97% to 99.8% after 5 years for newly diagnosed basal-cell cancer (BCC), decreasing to 94% or less for recurrent basal-cell cancer. Radiation oncologists quote cure rates from 90 to 95% for BCCs less than 1 or 2 cm, and 85 to 90% for BCCs larger than 1 or 2 cm. The Surgical excision cure rate varies from 90 to 95% for wide margins (4 to 6 mm) and small tumors, to as low as 70% for narrow margins and large tumors.

Society and culture
Some commentators argue that skin cancer surgery, including Mohs surgery, is overutilised as rates of skin cancer surgery are increasing worldwide. It is unclear if this relates to higher rates of skin cancer, increased vigilance in diagnosis, and increased availability of the procedure, or patient and doctor preferences. The incidence of Mohs surgery increased significantly over the decade between 2004 and 2014. In a sample of 100 Mohs surgeries, the total cost ranged from US$474 to US$7,594, with the higher costs for hospital-based complex procedures. In Australia, the direct out of pocket cost to patients may vary from $0 to $4000. When the non-Mohs surgery is performed by multiple doctors including pathologists the costs may be increased further. This is especially true when the cancer is incompletely excised and requires repeat surgery.

History
Originally, Mohs used a chemical paste (an escharotic agent) to cauterize and kill the tissue. It was made of zinc chloride and bloodroot (the root of the plant Sanguinaria canadensis, which contains the alkaloid sanguinarine). The original ingredients were 40.0 g Stibnite, 10.0 g Sanguinaria canadensis, and 34.5 ml of saturated zinc chloride solution.

This paste is similar to black salve or "Hoxsey's paste" (see Hoxsey Therapy), a fraudulent patent medicine, but its usage is different. Hoxsey used the paste for long periods, a harmful practice that was rapidly discredited. Mohs left the paste on the wound only overnight, and the following day, the cancer and surrounding skin would be anesthetized and the cancer removed. The specimen was then excised, and the tissue examined under the microscope. If cancer remained, more paste was applied, and the patient would return the following day. Later, local anesthetic and frozen section histopathology applied to fresh tissue allowed the procedure to be performed the same day, with less tissue destruction, and similar cure rate.

See also
 American College of Mohs Surgery

References

External links

 American Cancer Society statement about treating basal-cell carcinoma, including via Mohs surgery
 American College of Mohs Surgery

Dermatologic surgery
Surgical procedures and techniques